Be Strong is the debut studio album by London-based musical duo the 2 Bears. It was released on 30 January 2012 in the United Kingdom. The album includes the singles "Bear Hug" and "Work".

Singles
 "Bear Hug" was released as the album's lead single on 29 May 2011. The song peaked to number 187 on the UK Singles Chart, number 13 on the UK Indie Chart and number 26 on the UK Dance Chart.
 "Work" was released as the album's second single on 1 January 2012.

Track listing

Chart performance
On 5 February 2012, the album entered the UK Albums Chart at number 35.

Release history

References

2012 debut albums
The 2 Bears albums
Mercury Records albums